Switzerland competed at the 2016 Summer Paralympics in Rio de Janeiro, Brazil, from 7 to 18 September 2016.

Disability classifications

Every participant at the Paralympics has their disability grouped into one of five disability categories: amputation, the condition may be congenital or sustained through injury or illness; cerebral palsy; wheelchair athletes (there is often overlap between this and other categories); visual impairment, including blindness; and Les autres, any physical disability that does not fall strictly under one of the other categories, for example dwarfism or multiple sclerosis. Each Paralympic sport then has its own classifications, dependent upon the specific physical demands of competition. Events are given a code, made of numbers and letters, describing the type of event and classification of the athletes competing. Some sports, such as athletics, divide athletes by both the category and severity of their disabilities; other sports, for example swimming, group competitors from different categories together, the only separation being based on the severity of the disability.

Medallists

The following Swiss competitors won medals at the Games. In the 'by discipline' sections below, medallists' names are in bold.

Archery

Switzerland qualified one archer for the Rio Games following their performance at the 2015 World Archery Para Championships. Martin Imboden earned the spot in the men's compound open event after winning the Paralympic secondary tournament.

Cycling 

With one pathway for qualification being one highest ranked NPCs on the UCI Para-Cycling male and female Nations Ranking Lists on 31 December 2014, Switzerland qualified for the 2016 Summer Paralympics in Rio, assuming they continued to meet all other eligibility requirements.

Equestrian 
The country earned an individual slot via the Para Equestrian Individual Ranking List Allocation method.

Shooting 

The last direct qualifying event for Rio in shooting took place at the 2015 IPC Shooting World Cup in Fort Benning in November. Paul Schnider earned a qualifying spot for their country at this competition in the P3 Mixed 25m Pistol SH1 event.

See also
Switzerland at the 2016 Summer Olympics

References

Nations at the 2016 Summer Paralympics
2016
2016 in Swiss sport